Kunamnenivaripalem is a village in Chimakurthy mandal, located in Prakasam district of Andhra Pradesh. Farming is the main activity of the community. The main crop cultivated is rice during Kharif in the lands irrigated by the tank which gets seasonal inflow from the Nagarjuna Sagar Project (NSP) right canal. The main crop cultivated is rice during Kharif in the lands irrigated by the tank which gets seasonal inflow from the Nagarjuna Sagar Project (NSP) right canal.

Villages in Prakasam district